Washington Trails Association (WTA) is a non-profit organization that advocates protection of hiking trails and wilderness, conducts trail maintenance, and promotes hiking in Washington state. Their principal values emphasize the benefits nature can have on the mind and body, the willingness people have to protect the trails they love, and the importance of ensuring that the outdoors is made accessible to all. Its offices are currently located on the corner of Second and Cherry in Downtown Seattle.

History 
WTA first began with publishing Signpost, a grassroots magazine started in 1966 by the late guidebook author Louise Marshall. The late hiking guidebook author Ira Spring is also notable to WTA's history, who was a member of the Board of Directors from 1982 until he died in 2003. WTA still publishes a magazine for hikers, now under the name, Washington Trails. There is also now an online website where guides to hikes and trail damage reports can be found.

In 1993, WTA's former executive director, the late Greg Ball, launched the organization's volunteer trail maintenance program, completing 250 hours of trail work on public lands. Between 1995 and 2005, the hours of trail maintenance were reported to be around 500,000. In 2016, WTA logged 150,000 hours of trail maintenance by 4,700 volunteers on National Parks, National Forest, and state lands. As of 2017, Jill Simmons took on the leading role of CEO and continued the work of protecting the trails.

Trail work 

WTA volunteers work on both backcountry and front-country trails. WTA partnered with Washington State and Recreation Commission to make the Hardy Ridge trail system, located in Beacon Rock State Park, functional for backcountry hikers, mountain bikers, and equestrians by 2006. Trail work was also performed on the front-country trail named Margaret's Way, located on Squak Mountain. Contributors to this project include Washington Trails Association and the Issaquah Alps Trail Club, as well as King County Parks.

Programs 
Washington Trails Association offers programs that provide opportunities for people to get involved in the outdoors. Via the Outdoor Leadership Training program, conducted by Andrew Pringle, volunteers can take the trail leader position on a trip after attending one of Pringle’s courses. The people who attend these hikes are allowed to utilize the organization’s gear library: a space where outdoor equipment can be borrowed free of a rental charge. WTA also coordinates regional work parties where youth can participate in trail maintenance. In 2020, high school students volunteered to work on a week-long project to re-route Trail 130 and 131 at Mount Spokane.

Stewardship 
WTA is one of 50 outdoor organization members of the Recreate Responsibly Coalition. In 2020, the coalition added six principles to their recommendations for acting responsibly in the outdoors; the principles were meant to encourage preparation, foster inclusion, and protect public lands. The principles specifically highlight knowing the status of where you want to go before you go, planning accordingly based on the status information, valuing inclusivity, showing respect to others, leaving no trace, and acting with the goal of sustainability in outdoor spaces.

References

External links 
 Washington Trails Association – official website
 WTA on Facebook – organizational Facebook page

Environmental organizations based in Washington (state)
Organizations established in 1966
Hiking organizations in the United States